Moussa Sylla may refer to:
 Moussa Sylla (footballer, born 1989), Ivorian footballer
 Moussa Sylla (footballer, born 1999), French footballer
 Fodé Moussa Sylla (born 1988), Guinean footballer